The inertial supercharging effect is the increase of volumetric efficiency in the cylinder of an engine.

Background
The internal combustion engine is the most common engine found in mechanical devices across the world.  The engine is powered by an air/gasoline mixture and the physics principles of heat and pressure.

Overview 
Inertial supercharging effect is the result of incoming fuel/air charge developing momentum greater than intake stroke would generate alone. It is achieved by the  
careful design of the shape of the piston head, the valves and cam profile/valve timing which creates a vacuum that pulls more exhaust gases (and some of the intake gasses) out of the engine ??{certainly in a 4 stroke engine exhaust gases are pushed out by the piston in the "exhaust" stroke or exhaust phase, not pulled out by any vacuum. For exhaust gases to be pulled out by any vacuum said vacuum would need to be created in the exhaust manifold, neither the shape of the piston heads, nor any action of the valves or cam profile can possibly serve to create a vacuum in the exhaust manifold. This whole overview probably needs re-writing, it makes very little sense}. This is immediately followed by a reflected pressure wave timed to force the extra intake gasses back into the cylinder, thus achieving a greater mass of air/fuel mix in the combustion chamber than possible with conventional methods. Expansion chambers only work well at a narrow engine speed range which is why two stroke engines are referred to as having a "powerband". Since the early 1980s exhaust powervalves have been developed which have the effect of altering the timing and/or volume of the expansion chamber, greatly improving the spread of power of high output two stroke engines.

The idea behind this effect is that if more pressure is created within the cylinder, the faster the piston will be able to move.  The volumetric efficiency is maximized to increase the amount of air/fuel mixture in the cylinder during each cycle.  In turn, a greater air/fuel mixture in a cylinder will create a greater pressure therefore exerting a greater force on the piston.  This increased force on each individual piston increases the potential horsepower of the entire engine. The timing of the opening and closing of the valves is essential to ensure the air in the cylinder is maximized to create the most power in each cycle.

See also 

 Exhaust pulse pressure charging
 Kadenacy effect
 Pressure wave supercharger
 Supercharge

References 

 “Timing Is Everything .” Magnaflux Inspection - Aircraft Engine Overhaul, Victor Aviation Services, www.victor-aviation.com/Inertia_Supercharging_AirFlow_Optimization.ph
 Brain, Marshall, and Kristen Hall Geisler. “How Car Engines Work.” HowStuffWorks, 5 Apr. 2000, auto.howstuffworks.com/engine1.htm
 P.W. Performance Exhaust 
 Bohacz, Ray T. “Forced Induction .” Hemmings.com, May 2015, www.hemmings.com/magazine/hcc/2015/05/Forced-Induction/3748512.html.
 Hu, Bo, et al. “Observations on and Potential Trends for Mechanically Supercharging a Downsized Passenger Car Engine:a Review.” Journal of Research in Crime and Delinquency, 6 Apr. 2016, journals.sagepub.com/doi/full/10.1177/0954407016636971.
 Kertes, Rick. “Valve Timing Events and the Order of Importance.” Engine Builder Magazine, 19 Apr. 2017, www.enginebuildermag.com/2016/04/valve-timing-events-and-the-order-of-importance/.

Two-stroke engine technology
Supercharging